The Biokovo Road is, at 1,762 m.a.s.l., the highest road in Croatia. It is a one-lane access road that branches out from the D512 Makarska-Vrgorac state road at 365 m.a.s.l. and ends at Sveti Jure, the highest peak of Biokovo and the third highest peak in Croatia.

The road is windy, steep and narrow, only 3 to 4 meters wide near the top, and is not recommended for less skilled drivers.

Biokovo Road was originally built up to 897 m.a.s.l. by the Austro-Hungarian Army in 1878. In 1964, it was extended to the top of the mountain in order to install a television transmitter there. The road was paved in 1978.

See also
 List of highest paved roads in Europe
 List of highest paved roads in Europe by country
 List of mountain passes

References

Roads in Croatia
Transport in Split-Dalmatia County